The 5th Wave is a young adult science fiction novel written by American author Rick Yancey. It was published on May 7, 2013, by G. P. Putnam's Sons. The novel is the first in the 5th Wave trilogy, followed by The Infinite Sea and The Last Star. The story follows 16-year-old Cassie Sullivan as she tries to survive in a world devastated by  waves of alien invasions that decimated the Earth's population.

Critics have compared the book favorably to The Hunger Games and The Road, and noted that it "should do for aliens what Twilight did for vampires." Sony Pictures released a film adaptation in January 2016.

Characters
Cassiopeia Marie Sullivan or "Cassie" – the novel's protagonist, is 16 years old, short, and has curly strawberry-blonde hair. Before the waves hit, she had a crush on Ben Parish, a popular football player. She has a relationship with her "silencer", Evan Walker.

Evan Walker – a boy from rural Ohio who lived with his large family; he is described as having chocolate brown eyes and brown hair. His family and girlfriend were all killed during the 3rd Wave. He has a brief love relationship with Cassie.

Benjamin Thomas Parish/Zombie – a popular football player and honours student at Cassie's high school; he is described as tall, buff, and dark-haired. While in high school, Cassie had a crush on Ben, but he never noticed her. After the 3rd Wave, Ben contracts the plague but is "rescued" by soldiers who take him to Camp Haven. There, he becomes a part of Squad 53 and is renamed Zombie. Zombie soon discovers the "soldiers" are actually aliens in disguise. He manages to escape with Cassie and Sammy.

Sissy Parish – Ben's little sister. She was killed by intruders while escaping her house with Ben. In a moment stricken with fear, he left her behind. He wears her locket around his neck in memory of her. Cassie said Sissy would be hoisted onto Ben's shoulders after his football games, and she would join him in a parade. He says he misses Sissy terribly.

Samuel Jackson Sullivan – Cassie's little brother who is five years old; he is described as having messy brown hair and large, teddy bear eyes. He is taken away from the refugee camp where he, his father, and Cassie had stayed. He is taken to Camp Haven to join Squad 53, after being renamed Nugget. Nugget and Zombie become good friends, and Zombie acts like Sam's big brother. Sammy manages to escape with Cassie and Zombie at the end of the novel.

Marika/Ringer – a girl who joins Squad 53 after Tank, a former member, goes "Dorothy" (slang for crazy); she is described as tall and skinny, with pale white skin and long, glossy, straight black hair, three-quarters Asian and a quarter Apache. She is described as the best shot in the group and is very quiet, yet scary. She and Zombie become friends, and she helps him shoot better. She is often threatening and serious toward the other squad members, but can also be vulnerable at times.

Commander Vosch – the leader of the soldiers and the mastermind behind the plans. He is very sadistic, cruel, and unfeeling. He at first is shown as a "hero" to those at Cassie's refugee camp, but he soon reveals his true nature by personally killing Cassie's father, destroying the camp, and abducting the children, including Sam, to fight. He is also responsible for Camp Haven and becomes familiar with Cassie, Ringer, and Ben Parish.

Dumbo – a member of Squad 53; he is around 12 years old, has huge ears, and is good with medicine and anatomy.

Alison/Teacup – a member of Squad 53; she is seven years old. Originally, she was the only girl and was the youngest in the squad before Nugget and Ringer arrived.

Poundcake – a member of Squad 53; he is around eight years old, large and chubby, and rarely speaks, but is good with a gun.

Flintstone – the former leader of Squad 53; he was around 16 years old and had a unibrow. He often challenged Zombie's authority, mainly in jealousy over his job as leader. Flintstone ends up going crazy or "going Dorothy" and ends up dead.

Tank – a former member of Squad 53. He went "Dorothy" (crazy) and was taken away. Dumbo and Zombie discover him dead in the P&D (Processing and Disposal) hangar.

Kenny/Oompa – a member of Squad 53; he was around eight or nine years old, chubby, and had crooked teeth. After Zombie sets off an explosion, Oompa is impaled with shrapnel and dies after an unsuccessful attempt to save him.

Waves
First Wave: Lights Out: During the first wave, the Others release an EMP wave that takes out all electronic technology and kills half a million people by shorting out all moving vehicles, including planes in mid-flight.

Second wave: Surf's Up: The Others, realizing that roughly 40 percent of Earth's population lives within 60 miles of the coastline, drop enormous rods "twice as tall as the Empire State Building and three times as heavy" onto the Earth's fault lines, causing massive tsunamis that wipe out three billion people.

Third wave: Pestilence: The Others launch a scheme to infect as many remaining survivors as possible with a deadly virus. Using the Earth's birds as carriers (via falling excrement), the plague claims 97% of remaining survivors. The virus, which resembles an advanced form of Ebola, causes victims to slowly bleed to death until eventually "you've become a viral bomb. And when you explode, you blast everyone around you with the virus".

Fourth wave: Silencers: After the 3rd wave, the remaining human population tries desperately to survive off whatever resources remain by looting, all the while clinging to the hope that "the people in charge", wherever they may be, are working toward a solution. Eventually, this belief seems legitimate when an impressive battalion of soldiers (with functioning vehicles) arrives at the makeshift camp where Cassie, Sam, and her father are staying. The soldiers and commander, however, only appear interested in the children and promptly load them onto waiting buses before ordering all the adults into the camp barracks. Once the humans are surrounded, Commander Vosch orders a massacre and kills everyone at the camp. Cassie, however, narrowly escapes and witnesses her father's death by Vosch's hand. At this moment, the 4th wave becomes clear: not all "humans" are actually humans.

Fifth wave: The Fifth wave is referenced in "The Last Star".

Reception
Critical reception of the book has been positive. It received starred reviews from both Publishers Weekly and Kirkus, and reviewers have noted that it has broad audience appeal, blurring the lines between young adult and adult fiction, and between genre and mainstream fiction, so that it cannot be easily wedged into one genre despite having many of the characteristics of young adult fiction. The New York Times listed it as one of the best young adult books of 2013, and it was a Goodreads finalist for Best Young Adult Fantasy or Science Fiction novel in 2013.

Sequels

The 5th Wave is the first book in a trilogy. The second book in the series, The Infinite Sea, was released on September 16, 2014. The third book in the series, The Last Star, was released on May 24, 2016.

Film adaptation

A film adaption with the same name was released by Columbia Pictures on January 22, 2016. It was directed by J Blakeson, with a screenplay by Susannah Grant, Akiva Goldsman, and Jeff Pinkner.

References

External links
 
 

2013 science fiction novels
2013 American novels
 Alien invasions in novels
 American novels adapted into films
 American science fiction novels
American young adult novels
 Children's science fiction novels
Novels about extraterrestrial life
Novels set in Ohio
 The 5th Wave
 Works about child soldiers
 Science fiction novels adapted into films
G. P. Putnam's Sons books